Mako Yamada (山田真子, born 26 May 1994) is a Japanese kickboxer and former boxer, currently competing in the atomweight division of K-1. 

Yamada is a former boxing world champion, having held the WBO mini flyweight title in 2014. She is the first Japanese woman to claim a world title, the first Japanese woman to win a world title in Korea and the first female Japanese fighter to win a WBO world title.

A professional competitor since 2010, Yamada is the 2010 J-Girls Next Challenger tournament winner, as well as the 2010 J-Girls atomweight champion.

Kickboxing career

J-Girls

Next Title Challenger Tournament
Yamada made her professional debut against yu-kid at J-NETWORK「J-GIRLS Catch The stone〜8」, in the quarterfinals of the J-Girls Atomweight Next Title Challenger Tournament, on May 30, 2010. She won the fight by unanimous decision, with scores of 30–27, 30–28 and 30–28.

Yamada was scheduled to face Masae Marunaka in the tournament semifinals, held at J-NETWORK「J-GIRLS Catch The stone〜9」 on July 25, 2010. She won the fight by unanimous decision, with scores of 30–27, 30–28 and 30–28.

Yamada advanced to the tournament finals, where she faced the #4 ranked J-Girls atomweight Miho at J-NETWORK「J-GIRLS Catch The stone〜10」 on September 20, 2010. Miho was the more experienced competitor heading into the bout, with nine professional bouts. Yamada won the fight by unanimous decision, with scores of 30–27, 30–27 and 30–28.

J-Girls Atomweight champion
Winning the tournament earned Yamada the right to challenge the reigning atomweight champion Ayaka Miyauchi. They were scheduled to fight at J-NETWORK「J-GIRLS Women's Festival 2010 ~ Fighting women are beautiful ~」 on December 12, 2010. Yamada won the fight by a dominant unanimous decision, with scores of 50–47, 50–46, 50–47.

Yamada was scheduled to face Nana Kusakabe at King of Strikers 6 on April 10, 2011. the fight was ruled a majority draw, with one of the three judges scoring the fight for Yamada.

Yamada was scheduled to face the #1 ranked J-Girls mini-flyweight Momi at J-NETWORK「J-GIRLS 2011 〜Born This Way 2nd〜」 on July 10, 2011. The fight was ruled  a majority draw. Two of the judges scored the fight as a draw, with scores of 29–29 and 30–30, while the third judge scored it 30–29 for Momi.

Yamada made her first title defense against the #1 ranked atomweight contender Miho at J-NETWORK「J-GIRLS 2011 〜Born This Way FINAL〜」 on November 27, 2011. Yamada won the closely contested bout by majority decision, with two of the judges scoring the fight 50–48 in her favor, while the third judge scored it as a 49–49 draw.

Following her exhibition bout with Saya Ito on February 19, 2012, Yamada announced she would retire from kickboxing and transition to professional boxing.

Following a successful two-year boxing career, which saw her win the WBO mini flyweight title, Yamada returned to kickboxing to face Jon Yejin at NEO GENERATION on December 14, 2014. She won the fight by unanimous decision.

K-1
Yamada made her return to kickboxing in late 2019. She was scheduled to face Moe Takahashi at Krush 107 on November 8, 2019. Yamada won the fight by an extra round split decision.

Yamada was scheduled to face Yu Fukuhara at K-1 World GP 2020 in Fukuoka on November 2, 2020. She won the fight by unanimous decision, with scores of 30–29, 30–28 and 30–28.

Yamada was scheduled to face the four-time Shootboxing tournament winner Mio Tsumura at K'Festa 4 Day 2 on March 27, 2021. Tsumura won the fight by a wide unanimous decision, with two of the judges giving her a 30–26 scorecard, while the third judge scored the fight 30–25 for Tsumura.

Yamada was scheduled to face Nozomi Sigemura at K-1 World GP 2021 in Fukuoka on July 17, 2021. Yamada won the fight by unanimous decision.

Yamada was scheduled to face Chan Lee at Krush 131 on November 20, 2021. She won the fight by unanimous decision.

Yamada faced Marine Bigey at K-1: Ring of Venus on June 25, 2022. She won the fight by unanimous decision.

Boxing career
Yamada made her professional boxing debut against Chadaphorn Suklert on April 12, 2012. She won the fight by unanimous decision. She would go on to amass a 6-0 record over the course of the next two years, earning two stoppage victories along the way.

She was scheduled to challenge the reigning WBO mini-flyweight champion Hong Su-yun on February 9, 2014, in what was the fourth title defense for the reigning champion. Despite coming into the fight as an underdog, Yamada won the fight by split decision, becoming the first Japanese woman to win a world title.

Championships and accomplishments

Kickboxing
J-Network
J-Girls Atomweight Next Title Challenger Tournament Winner
J-Girls Atomweight Championship  (One successful title defense)

Boxing
WBO
WBO World Mini Flyweight Championship

Kickboxing record

|-  style="background:#cfc"
| 2022-06-25|| Win || align=left| Marine Bigey || K-1: Ring of Venus || Tokyo, Japan || Decision (Unanimous)|| 3 || 3:00 
|-

|-  style="text-align:center; background:#cfc;"
| 2021-11-20 || Win ||align=left| Chan Lee || Krush 131 || Tokyo, Japan || Decision (Unanimous) || 3 || 3:00

|-  style="text-align:center; background:#cfc;"
| 2021-07-17 || Win ||align=left| Nozomi Shigemura || K-1 World GP 2021 in Fukuoka || Fukuoka, Japan || Decision (Unanimous) || 3 ||  3:00

|-  style="text-align:center; background:#fbb;"
| 2021-03-27 || Loss ||align=left| Mio Tsumura || K'Festa 4 Day 2 || Yoyogi, Japan || Decision (Unanimous) || 3 ||  3:00

|-  style="text-align:center; background:#cfc;"
| 2020-11-02 || Win ||align=left| Yu Fukuhara || K-1 World GP 2020 in Fukuoka || Fukuoka, Japan || Decision (Unanimous) || 3 ||  3:00

|-  style="text-align:center; background:#cfc;"
| 2019-11-08 || Win ||align=left| Moe Takahashi || Krush 107 || Osaka, Japan || Ext. R. Decision (Split) || 4 ||  2:00

|-  style="text-align:center; background:#cfc;"
| 2014-12-14 || Win ||align=left| Jon Yejin || NEO GENERATION || Fukuoka, Japan || Decision (Unanimous) || 3 ||  3:00

|-  style="text-align:center; background:#cfc;"
| 2011-11-27|| Win ||align=left| Miho || J-NETWORK "J-GIRLS 2011 〜Born This Way FINAL〜" || Tokyo, Japan || Decision (Majority) || 5 ||  2:00
|-
! style=background:white colspan=9 |

|-  style="text-align:center; background:#c5d2ea;"
| 2011-07-10 || Draw ||align=left| Momi || J-NETWORK "J-GIRLS 2011 〜Born This Way 2nd〜" || Tokyo, Japan || Decision (Majority) || 3 ||  2:00

|-  style="text-align:center; background:#c5d2ea;"
| 2011-04-10 || Draw ||align=left| Nana Kusakabe || King of Strikers 6 || Fukuoka, Japan || Decision (Majority) || 3 ||  2:00

|-  style="text-align:center; background:#cfc;"
| 2010-12-12 || Win ||align=left| Ayaka Miyauchi || J-NETWORK J-GIRLS Women's Festival 2010 ~ Fighting women are beautiful ~ || Tokyo, Japan || Decision (Unanimous) || 5 ||  2:00
|-
! style=background:white colspan=9 |

|-  style="text-align:center; background:#cfc;"
| 2010-09-20 || Win ||align=left| Miho || J-NETWORK "J-GIRLS Catch The stone〜10", Tournament Final || Tokyo, Japan || Decision (Unanimous) || 3 ||  2:00
|-
! style=background:white colspan=9 |

|-  style="text-align:center; background:#cfc;"
| 2010-07-25 || Win ||align=left| Masae Marunaka || J-NETWORK "J-GIRLS Catch The stone〜9", Tournament Semifinal || Tokyo, Japan || Decision (Unanimous) || 3 ||  2:00

|-  style="text-align:center; background:#cfc;"
| 2010-05-30 || Win ||align=left| yu-kid || J-NETWORK "J-GIRLS Catch The stone〜8", Tournament Quarterfinal || Tokyo, Japan || Decision (Unanimous) || 3 ||  2:00

|-
| colspan=9 | Legend:    

|-  style="background:#cfc;"
| 2009-09-27 || Win ||align=left| Nana Kusakabe || J-GIRLS Catch The stone～4 || Tokyo, Japan || Decision (Unanimous)|| 2 || 1:30
|-
! style=background:white colspan=9 |
|-
|-  style="background:#fbb;"
| 2007-05-20 || Loss ||align=left| Madoka Jinnai || J-NETWORK "Onna Matsuri Final round" || Tokyo, Japan || Decision (Unanimous)|| 2 || 1:30
|-
| colspan=9 | Legend:

Professional boxing record

See also
 List of female kickboxers
 List of female boxers
 List of WBO female world champions

References

Japanese kickboxers
1994 births
Living people
Japanese female kickboxers
Japanese women boxers
Mini-flyweight boxers
People from Itoshima, Fukuoka
Sportspeople from Fukuoka Prefecture